Casel may refer to:

People 
Ayodele Casel (born 1975), American actress and dancer
Nitanju Bolade Casel, American singer
Odo Casel (1886–1948), also known as Johannes Casel, German Catholic theologian and monk

Other uses 
CASEL, the Collaborative for Academic, Social, and Emotional Learning, American education institute
Schloss Casel, a manor house in Kasel-Golzig, Brandenburg, Germany

See also 
Casal (disambiguation)
Cassel (disambiguation)